Tom Lacoux (born 25 January 2002) is a French professional footballer who plays as a midfielder for  club Bordeaux.

Career 
On 5 July 2020, Lacoux signed his first professional contract with Bordeaux. He made his professional debut with Bordeaux in a 3–1 Ligue 1 loss to Reims on 23 December 2020.

References

External links
Girondins de Bordeaux profile

2002 births
Living people
Footballers from Bordeaux
French footballers
Association football midfielders
FC Girondins de Bordeaux players
Ligue 1 players
Championnat National 3 players
Ligue 2 players